Azafullerenes are a class of heterofullerenes in which the element substituting for carbon is nitrogen. They can be in the form of a hollow sphere, ellipsoid, tube, and many other shapes. Spherical azafullerenes resemble the balls used in football (soccer).  They are also a member of the carbon nitride class of materials that include beta carbon nitride (β-C3N4), predicted to be harder than diamond.  Besides the pioneering work of a couple of academic groups, this class of compounds has so far garnered little attention from the broader fullerene research community.  Many properties and structures are yet to be discovered for the highly-nitrogen substituted subset of molecules.

The first fullerene molecule to be discovered, and the family's namesake, buckminsterfullerene (C60), was prepared in 1985 by Richard Smalley, Robert Curl, James Heath, Sean O'Brien, and Harold Kroto at Rice University. A fullerene is any molecule composed entirely of carbon, in the form of a hollow sphere, ellipsoid, tube, and many other shapes. Spherical fullerenes are also called buckyballs, and they resemble the balls used in football (soccer). Fullerenes are similar in structure to graphite, which is composed of stacked graphene sheets of linked hexagonal rings; but they may also contain pentagonal (or sometimes heptagonal) rings.

Azafullerenes were first discovered in 1993 and reported in the California State Science Fair.  The derivatives were formed in the gap between two graphite rods connected to an electric power supply.  A small air leak led to contamination of the inert atmosphere and the subsequent reaction.  The materials can also be formed by chemical reactions on fullerene or laser ablation of graphitic materials.

Subsequent work revealed a wide range of carbon nitride structures.   Examples include (C59N)2 (biazafullerenyl),C58N2 (diaza[60]fullerene), C57N3 (triaza[60]fullerene) and C48N12.  The nitrogen atoms substitute for carbon atoms on the cage-like molecules. Much of the work has been theoretical in nature.  The C48N12 molecule was calculated to be an insulator, with the eight all-carbon rings forming regions of extended electron delocalization.

References

Fullerenes